The Cottage Hill Historic District is a  historic district in Montgomery, Alabama.  It is roughly bounded by Goldthwaite, Maxwell, Holt, and Clayton streets and contains 116 contributing buildings, the majority of them in the Queen Anne style.    The district was placed on the Alabama Register of Landmarks and Heritage on April 16, 1975, and the National Register of Historic Places on November 7, 1976.

See also
National Register of Historic Places listings in Montgomery County, Alabama
Properties on the Alabama Register of Landmarks and Heritage in Montgomery County, Alabama

References

National Register of Historic Places in Montgomery, Alabama
Properties on the Alabama Register of Landmarks and Heritage
Historic districts in Montgomery, Alabama
Historic districts on the National Register of Historic Places in Alabama